Brook Maurio (née Busey; born June 14, 1978), known professionally by the pen name Diablo Cody, is an American writer and producer. She gained recognition for her candid blog and subsequent memoir, Candy Girl: A Year in the Life of an Unlikely Stripper (2005). Cody received critical acclaim for her screenwriting debut film, Juno (2007), winning the Academy Award for Best Original Screenplay, the BAFTA Award for Best Original Screenplay, the Independent Spirit Award for Best First Screenplay, and the Writers Guild of America Award for Best Original Screenplay.

Cody created, wrote, and produced the Showtime comedy drama series United States of Tara (2009–2011). She wrote, produced, and made her directorial debut with the comedy drama film Paradise (2013). Cody also wrote and produced the horror comedy film Jennifer's Body (2009), the comedy drama film Young Adult (2011), which earned her a second nomination for the Writers Guild of America Award for Best Original Screenplay, the musical comedy film Ricki and the Flash (2015), and the comedy drama film Tully (2018).

Cody won a Tony Award for Best Book of a Musical for Jagged Little Pill, her first musical-theater undertaking. She has been a member of the Academy of Motion Picture Arts and Sciences in the Writer's Branch since 2008.

Early life

Diablo Cody was born Brook Busey on June 14, 1978 in Lemont, Illinois, a suburb of Chicago, where she and her older brother Marc were raised. She is the daughter of Pam and Greg Busey. Her mother is of Italian descent and her father is of German ancestry. Cody was raised Apostolic Christian and attended SS. Cyril & Methodius School and Benet Academy, Roman Catholic schools in the Chicago suburbs. At this time, she went by her birth name Brook.

In 2000, she graduated from the University of Iowa with a Bachelor of Arts in Media. While at the University of Iowa, she worked in the acquisitions department in the main university library. Her first jobs were doing secretarial work at a Chicago law firm and later proofreading copy for advertisements that played on Twin Cities radio stations.

Career

2001–2004: Blogging and stripping
Cody began a parody blog called Red Secretary, detailing the (fictional) exploits of a secretary living in Belarus. The events were thinly-veiled allegories for events that happened in Cody's real life, but told from the perspective of a disgruntled, English-idiom-challenged Eastern Bloc girl.

Cody's first bona fide blog appeared under the nickname Darling Girl after she had moved from Chicago to Minneapolis, Minnesota.

In March 2003, Cody started an adult blog called The Pussy Ranch, using a pen name invented while speeding through Cody, Wyoming listening to the song "El Diablo" by Arcadia. On a whim, Cody signed up for amateur night at a Minneapolis strip club called the Skyway Lounge. Having enjoyed the experience, and seeing reader interest, she eventually quit her day job to become a full-time stripper. Cody also spent time working peep shows at Sex World, a Minneapolis adult novelty and DVD store.

While still stripping, Cody began writing for City Pages, an alternative Twin Cities weekly newspaper. She left City Pages just before it changed editorial hands, and has since written for the now-defunct Jane magazine. In December 2007, Cody began writing a column for the magazine Entertainment Weekly.

2005–2010: Juno, Jennifer's Body, and acclaim
At the age of 27, Cody wrote her memoir Candy Girl: A Year in the Life of an Unlikely Stripper. The memoir began after Mason Novick, who would soon become Cody's manager, showed interest in her sharp and sarcastic voice. Based on the popularity of her blog, Novick was able to secure her a publishing contract with Gotham Books.

After the completion of her book, Cody was encouraged by Mason Novick to try writing a screenplay. Within months she wrote Juno, a coming-of-age story about a teenager's unplanned pregnancy. The script was completed in February 2005, and was optioned by a producer by that summer. The Jason Reitman-directed comedy stars Elliot Page and Michael Cera.

Juno was runner-up for the Toronto International Film Festival People's Choice Award, won second prize at the Rome Film Festival, and earned four Academy Award nominations, including for Best Picture. Cody herself won an Academy Award for Best Original Screenplay for her debut script, which also picked up a Golden Globe nomination and an Independent Spirit Award for Best First Screenplay. She also won screenplay honors from BAFTA, the Writers Guild of America, the Broadcast Film Critics Association, the National Board of Review, the Satellite Awards, and the 2008 Cinema for Peace Award for Most Valuable Work of Director, Producer & Screenwriter (shared with Jason Reitman, John Malkovich, Mason Novick, Russel Smith and Lianne Halfon).

The Juno script was read by many in Hollywood before the film was released, bringing Cody more opportunities. In July 2007, Showtime announced that it would be producing a pilot of Cody's DreamWorks television series, United States of Tara. Based on an idea by Steven Spielberg, Tara is a comedy about a mother with dissociative identity disorder, starring Toni Collette. The series began filming in Spring 2008, and premiered on January 18, 2009.

In October 2007, Cody sold a script titled Girly Style to Universal Studios, and a horror script called Jennifer's Body to Fox Atomic. Released on September 18, 2009, Jennifer's Body starred Megan Fox as the title character and Amanda Seyfried as the supporting character. She revised writer-director Steven Antin's script for his musical film Burlesque.

Cody made a small cameo appearance as herself in a 2008 episode of the television series 90210. She appeared in the same episode that marked the return of Tori Spelling as Donna Martin, in which Cody needed Spelling's character to make a dress for a red carpet event. In 2009, Cody signed on to script and produce a film adaptation of the Sweet Valley High young adult book series.

2011–present: Young Adult, Tully, and other works
In 2011, she was brought in to revise first-time feature director Fede Alvarez's script for the remake of Sam Raimi's 1980s horror film The Evil Dead. In October 2011, Cody began hosting an online celebrity interview program called "Red Band Trailer," on the broadband channel, L-studio.  She originally launched the series privately on YouTube in summer 2010, and the Lexus channel picked it up the following year.

In 2011, Cody wrote and produced the comedy-drama film Young Adult. Cody was nominated by awards associations such as the Broadcast Film Critics Association and the Writers Guild of America. With Jason Reitman, Charlize Theron and Patton Oswalt, she shared the Chairman's Vanguard Award at the Palm Springs International Film Festival. In 2012, the Fempire, the collaboration of writers Cody, Dana Fox, Liz Meriwether, and Lorene Scafaria received the Creativity and Sisterhood Award from the Athena Film Festival for their support for one another in the competitive film industry.

On the WTF with Marc Maron podcast, on February 24, 2012, she said her next project would be directing her first film, which is about a young woman who abandons religion after surviving a plane crash. In February 2013, she announced that the film was called Paradise (firstly known as Lamb of God). Julianne Hough, Holly Hunter, Octavia Spencer, and Russell Brand starred in the cast. Mandate Pictures produced the film, which was released in October 2013.

In May 2013, it was announced that Cody would host her own talk show, Me Time with Diablo Cody, on TBS. The program would tailor "around Diablo’s unique perspective on all things pop culture and told in her very own tongue-in-cheek way," and "reveal a side of Hollywood and celebs that the public very rarely gets to see." Steve Agee was to be presenting and writing with her. Cody was a producer, alongside Mark Cronin and Courtland Cox. The series never materialized or made it to air.

Cody had numerous projects that were cancelled or stuck in development hell, including Time and a Half, which was to star Julianne Hough with Ol Parker directing. She also developed a teen drama series with Josh Schwartz for Fox called Prodigy. According to The Hollywood Reporter, it focused on "a 16-year-old genius who through home schooling has been isolated from her peers. Hoping to experience a "normal" teen social life before she enters the adult world of academia, she enrolls in her local high school. Her experiment goes off the rails when she finds herself adopted by a wild crowd, getting caught up in a whirlwind of romance and crime." Cody also created and wrote Warner Bros. Television's romantic comedy series pilot Alex+Amy.

Cody is the spokesperson of Barnard College's Athena Film Festival.

Cody wrote and produced the musical comedy film Ricki and the Flash (2015), starring Meryl Streep and directed by Jonathan Demme in his last feature film. She also wrote and produced the comedy drama film Tully (2018), reuniting her with Young Adult star Charlize Theron. The film was directed by Jason Reitman, who previously directed Cody's scripts for Juno and Young Adult.

She wrote the script for the Broadway musical Jagged Little Pill, based on the Alanis Morissette album of the same name. The musical premiered in November 2019.

In August 2020, Cody began working with Madonna on a screenplay of the singer's life. However, she later stepped away from the project in May 2022 after turning in a final draft, with the project also later being scrapped in January 2023.

Personal life
In her memoir, Cody wrote fondly of her boyfriend "Jonny" (Jon Hunt). They were married from 2004 until 2007, during which time she was known in personal life as Brook Busey-Hunt.

On April 6, 2010, Cody announced that she was expecting her first child with her husband Dan Maurio, who worked on Chelsea Lately, on which Cody also appeared frequently as a "roundtable" guest. The couple married in the summer of 2009. Their son was born in 2010. Cody had her second child in 2012. , Cody and Maurio have three children.

As of 2008, Cody resides in Los Angeles.

Cody is a friend of screenwriters Dana Fox (What Happens in Vegas, Couples Retreat) and Lorene Scafaria (Hustlers) and they often write their screenplays together in order to get advice from one another.

In light of Georgia’s 2019 anti-abortion law, Cody stated that she has regretted writing Juno, as critics have perceived it as an anti-abortion film.

Cody is a lifelong roller coaster enthusiast and has a tattoo of the Giant Dipper at San Diego’s Belmont Park on her right arm.

Filmography

Film

Short films
 Tight (2010)
 The Magic Bracelet (2013)

Uncredited script revisions
 Burlesque (2010)
 Evil Dead (2013)

Television

Acting roles

Podcasts

Awards and nominations

References
Notes

Sources
 Interview with Diablo Cody  about JUNO at the Telluride Film Festival, September 10, 2007
 Reitman and Cody, Consorting with 'Juno' - interviewed on NPR's Fresh Air, December 6, 2007
 Diablo Cody for Jennifer's Body, SuicideGirls interview, September 15, 2009
  City Pages interview with Diablo Cody, December 26, 2007
 Off the Stripper Pole and Into the Movies, The New York Times, December 2, 2007
 Overexposed - Salon.com

External links

 

1978 births
Living people
American women bloggers
American bloggers
American female erotic dancers
American erotic dancers
American feminist writers
Film producers from Illinois
21st-century American memoirists
Television producers from Illinois
American women television producers
American television writers
Best Original Screenplay Academy Award winners
Best Original Screenplay BAFTA Award winners
Feminist filmmakers
Independent Spirit Award winners
People from Lemont, Illinois
Screenwriters from Minnesota
Writers from Minneapolis
Pseudonymous women writers
Sex-positive feminists
Showrunners
University of Iowa alumni
American women screenwriters
American women television writers
Writers from Chicago
Writers Guild of America Award winners
American women memoirists
21st-century American women writers
Dancers from Illinois
Screenwriters from Illinois
Tony Award winners
American women film producers
Film producers from Minnesota
21st-century American screenwriters
21st-century pseudonymous writers